Heikki Taskinen (28 July 1905 – 15 May 1988) was a Finnish athlete. He competed in the men's discus throw at the 1928 Summer Olympics.

References

External links

1905 births
1988 deaths
Athletes (track and field) at the 1928 Summer Olympics
Finnish male discus throwers
Olympic athletes of Finland